Atheris barbouri is a small and rare species of  terrestrial viper endemic to the Uzungwe and Ukinga mountains of south-central Tanzania in Africa.

Taxonomy
The specific name, barbouri, is in honor of American herpetologist Thomas Barbour. Common names for include Uzungwe viper, Barbour's viper, worm-eating viper, Barbour's short-headed viper, and Uzungwe mountain bush viper. No subspecies are recognized.

Atheris barbouri was originally described in 1930 as a member of the genus Atheris (bush vipers). In 1978, it was assigned to the genus Adenorhinos by Dowling & Duellman. It differs morphologically from the Atheris group, but recent research by Lenk et al. (2001) suggests that it is closely related to the sympatric species, Atheris ceratophora, even though it differs morphologically from all other members of the genus Atheris. It was returned to the genus Atheris by Menegon et al. in 2011. Future research will show whether A. barbouri should be moved back to Adenorhinus, or that Atheris ceratophora and A. barbouri should form a separate clade.

Atheris barbouri is similar to Montatheris hindii and Proatheris superciliaris, which are also both terrestrial species from monotypic genera, as well as previous members of the Atheris group.

Description
Atheris barbouri is a small species reaching only  in total length (including tail). The head is broad, triangular and distinct from the neck. The snout is short and rounded. The head is covered with small, strongly keeled, imbricate scales. The eyes are prominent, about 1.5 times larger than the distance to the mouth. The nostril is in an extreme forward position and is part of a single nasal scale that touches the preocular scale.

The body is moderately slender, while the tail is relatively short, shorter than other species in the genus Atheris, and not prehensile. The dorsal scales are arranged in 20-23 rows at midbody, and are strongly keeled, except for those in the outermost rows, which are smooth. Ventral scales number 116-122 and are rounded. Subcaudals are 19-23 and are single (undivided). The anal plate is single.

The color pattern consists of a brown to blackish brown ground color with a pair of zigzag stripes that run dorsolaterally from the back of the head to the end of the tail. These stripes may form an irregular chain of darker rhombic blotches down the back. The tail may have a faint, black checkering. The belly color is greenish white to olive.

Distribution and habitat
The range of A. barbouri is extremely limited. It is known only from the Uzungwe and Ukinga mountains of south-central Tanzania.

The type locality is "Dabaga, Uzungwe Mountains, southeast of Iringa, Tanganyika Territory, altitude " (= Udzungwe Mountains, Tanzania).

It would seem that moist forest habitats are preferred, but it has also been found in gardens of tea farms.

Behavior and ecology
Little is known about the behavior of A. barbouri. It was first thought to be a burrowing species, but this is not likely as it has no obvious morphological adaptations for even a semifossorial life.

Feeding 
It is believed that A. barbouri specializes in eating slugs, earthworms, and other soft-bodied invertebrates, and possibly also frogs.

Reproduction 
Atheris barbouri is apparently oviparous. In February 1930, three females were collected that each contained 10 eggs. The largest egg measured .

Venom 
No information is available regarding the venom of A. barbouri, its composition, its toxicity, or the effects of a bite. No cases of envenomation have been recorded. However, because of the very limited distribution, bites are unlikely to occur.

References

Further reading

Dowling HG, Duellman WE (1978). Systematic Herpetology: a Synopsis of Families and Higher Categories. New York: Herpetologogical Information Search Systems Publications. 188 pp. [114.2].
Lenk P, Kalyabina S, Wink M, Joger U (2001). "Evolutionary relationships among the true vipers (Reptilia: Viperidae) inferred from mitochondrial DNA sequences". Molecular Phylogenics and Evolution 19 (1): 94-104.
Loveridge A (1930). "Preliminary Description of a new Tree Viper of the Genus Atheris from Tanganyika Territory". Proceedings of the New England Zoological Club 11: 107-108. [Atheris barbouri, new species, p. 107].
Marx H, Rabb GB (1965). "Relationships and Zoogeography of the Viperine Snakes (Family Viperidae)". Fieldiana: Zoology 44 (21): 161-206. [Adenorhinos barbouri, new combination, p. 187, (figs. 41c, 41d)]. 
Menegon M, Davenport TRB, Howell KM (2011). "Description of a new and critically endangered species of Atheris (Serpentes: Viperidae) from the Southern Highlands of Tanzania, with an overview of the country's tree viper fauna" Zootaxa 3120: 43–54.
Spawls S, Howell K, Hinkel H, Menegon M (2018). Field Guide to East African Reptiles, Second Edition. London: Bloomsbury Natural History. 624 pp. . [Atheris barbouri, p. 585].
Underwood G (1979). "Classification and distribution of venomous snakes in the world". pp. 15–40 [24]. In: Lee C-Y (1979). Snake Venoms. Handbook of Experimental Pharmacology (continuation of Handbuch der experimentellen Pharmakologie) Vol. 52. Berlin, Heidelberg, and New York: Springer-Verlag. 1,130 pp., 208 figs.

barbouri
Snakes of Africa
Reptiles of Tanzania
Endemic fauna of Tanzania
Taxa named by Arthur Loveridge
Reptiles described in 1930